Miriam Casillas García (born 24 June 1992) is a Spanish triathlete. She competed in the women's event at the 2016 Summer Olympics held in Rio de Janeiro, Brazil. In 2021, she competed in the women's event at the 2020 Summer Olympics in Tokyo, Japan. She also competed in the mixed relay event.

As of 2022, Garcia also competes at Super League Triathlon. She won her first Super League Triathlon event podium at the SLT Malibu 2022, where she came 2nd.

References

External links
 
 

1992 births
Living people
Spanish female triathletes
Olympic triathletes of Spain
Triathletes at the 2016 Summer Olympics
Triathletes at the 2020 Summer Olympics
European Games competitors for Spain
Triathletes at the 2015 European Games
21st-century Spanish women